Nathan and Clarissa Green House is a historic home located at Oswego in Oswego County, New York.  It is a two-story wood-frame residence with a gabled, three-bay facade and side entrance, built about 1849 with Greek Revival details.  It was built by Nathan Green, an African American and fugitive slave, who purchased the lot from Gerrit Smith.  It is located next to the John and Harriet McKenzie House.

It was listed on the National Register of Historic Places in 2002.

References

Houses on the National Register of Historic Places in New York (state)
Houses in Oswego County, New York
National Register of Historic Places in Oswego County, New York